Gold Ire Omotayo Agbomoagan (born 27 January 1994) is a Swiss professional footballer who plays as a striker for King's Lynn Town. He has also competed in mixed martial arts.

Career
Omotayo began his career in the youth team at FC Zürich as a goalkeeper, before dropping to regional football to play for FC Schlieren. In summer 2016, he moved to Wettswil-Bonstetten in the 1. Liga. He then moved to English non-league club Whitehawk in December 2017, signing a contract with the club in January 2018 after impressing in his first four games.

After scoring nine league goals in the second half of the 2017–18 season, Omotayo turned professional with Bury in July 2018, scoring the only goal of the game on his English Football League debut against Yeovil Town on 4 August 2018. On 5 October 2018, Bury loaned him to Maidstone United on a 35-day deal. Omotayo's first appearance after returning to Bury was as a substitute in the EFL Trophy match against Mansfield Town on 4 December 2018; Bury won 1–0.

On 25 August 2019, Omotayo signed for National League side Yeovil Town on a contract until the end of the 2019–20 season.

Omotayo signed for FC Halifax Town on a short-term deal on 3 October 2020, making his debut later that day. He left the club on 29 October 2020, having made five appearances in all competitions without scoring.

On 5 February 2021, Omotayo signed for National League North side Gloucester City after impressing on trial. He appeared in the only game between him signing for the club and the early curtailment of the season, a 1–1 draw against Chorley in which he scored a debut goal.

On 10 April 2021, Omotayo joined Wrexham on a non-contract basis, one of three signings for the club that day including Gloucester teammate Keanu Marsh-Brown.

After leaving Wrexham he signed for King's Lynn Town on 5 July 2021.

Career statistics

Honours
Bury
EFL League Two runner-up: 2018–19

Mixed martial arts
Omotayo had one mixed martial arts fight in September 2012.

References

1994 births
Living people
Swiss people of Nigerian descent
Swiss men's footballers
Swiss male mixed martial artists
Light heavyweight mixed martial artists
FC Zürich players
Whitehawk F.C. players
Bury F.C. players
Maidstone United F.C. players
Yeovil Town F.C. players
FC Halifax Town players
Gloucester City A.F.C. players
Wrexham A.F.C. players
King's Lynn Town F.C. players
English Football League players
National League (English football) players
Association football forwards
Swiss expatriate footballers
Swiss expatriate sportspeople in England
Expatriate footballers in England
Footballers from Zürich
Swiss expatriates in Wales
Expatriate footballers in Wales